Akulovskaya is a rural locality (a village) in Dvinskoye Rural Settlement of Verkhnetoyemsky District, Arkhangelsk Oblast, Russia. The population was 22 as of 2010.

Geography 
Akulovskaya is located on the Yorga River, 48 km southeast of Verkhnyaya Toyma (the district's administrative centre) by road. Fominskaya is the nearest rural locality.

References 

Rural localities in Verkhnetoyemsky District